Kelly Garrett may refer to:

 Kelly Garrett (Charlie's Angels), a character on the TV series Charlie's Angels
 Kelly Garrett (actress) (1944–2013), American actress and singer